MPM Media Print Makedonija was a publishing company in Macedonia that closed in 2017.

Imprints
 Dnevnik
 Utrinski vesnik
 Vest
 Makedonski Sport
 Tea Moderna
 Tea Kids
 GTA
 Sport Box

References

Mass media in Skopje
Publishing companies of North Macedonia
2004 establishments in Europe
2017 disestablishments in Europe